Blues License is the sixth studio album by Australian musician Renée Geyer. The album was released in June 1979 and peaked at number 41 on the Kent Music Report.

Track listing
Vinyl/ cassette (VPL1–0214)
Side One
  "The Thrill Is Gone" (Rick Darnell, Roy Hawkins)  – 6.55
  "That Did It Babe" (Pearl Woods) – 5.15
  "Set Me Free" (Deadric Malone) – 4.08
  "Bellhop Blues" (Kevin Borich) – 3.23 
Side Two
  "Won't Be Long" (J. Leslie McFarland) – 3.48
  "Stormy Monday"  (Aaron "T-Bone" Walker) – 6.43
  "Dust My Blues" (Elmore James) – 3.03
  "Feeling Is Believing" (Willie Henderson, Richard Parker)  – 7.01

Credits
Renée Geyer: vocals, backing vocals
Mal Logan: keyboards
Kevin Borich: guitar ("The Thrill Is Gone", "Set Me Free", "Bellhop Blues", "Stormy Monday", "Feeling Is Believing")
Tim Partridge: bass guitar (All tracks)
John Annas: drums (All except "Won't Be Long")
Kerrie Biddell: backing vocals ("Won't Be Long", "Feeling is Believing")
Tim Piper: guitar ("That Did It Babe", "Dust My Blues")
Mark Punch: guitar ("Won't Be Long")
Steve Hopes: drums ("Won't Be Long")
Ron King: harmonica ("Dust My Blues")

Charts

References

1979 albums
Renée Geyer albums
Blues rock albums by Australian artists
Mushroom Records albums
RCA Records albums